Madras School of Economics is an institution of higher education in economics, located in Chennai, India. Madras  School  of  Economics  was  founded  in  1993  as  a post-graduate institution for teaching and research in economics.
MSE offers a two-year Master's program in General Economics, Financial Economics, Applied Quantitative Finance, Actuarial Economics and Environmental economics affiliated to the Central University of Tamil Nadu, and a Ph.D. programme affiliated  to the University of Madras. In April 2018, the AICTE approved Technical Institution started two P. G. Diploma Programs in Financial Engineering and Research & Business Analytics.

MSE  has  undertaken  a  large  number  of research projects since its inception, including the World Bank sponsored Capacity Building Programme in Environmental Economics. The World Bank  project  involved  research,  training,  curriculum,  and  overseas fellowship components which were coordinated by MSE. Subsequently, the Ministry  of  Environment  and  Forests  approved  the  proposal  to  set  up  a Centre of Excellence in Environmental Economics at MSE.  MSE has also served  as  an  ENVIS  Centre  in  Environmental Economics under  the Environment Information System (ENVIS) of the Ministry of Environment and  Forests,  Government of India. A dedicated program on Trade and Environment, with support from the Ministry of Environment and Forests, Government of India, has been initiated at MSE. 
With a very active research unit and  well formulated  curriculum, it has made its presence felt in both government as well as  the  corporate sector.

It introduced a three-year Bachelor's course in Economics for school pass-outs in 2022.

Owing to the important role the institution has played since its inception, the Tamil Nadu state government decided to recognise the institution as an institute of special importance and enable it to award its own degrees and diplomas. The state government has also decided to help the school set up a centre for public finance to conduct research in public finance. The institution would provide policy suggestions to the government apart from running academic courses.

Founding members of the school 
 A. C. Muthiah - Chairman and President, Southern Petrochemicals Industries Corporation Limited Chennai
 A. Sivasailam - Chairman and Managing Director Tractor and Farm Equipments Limited, Chennai
 C. Rangarajan - Chairman, Prime Minister's Economic Advisory Council, Government of India
 Kaushik Basu - Professor, Cornell University USA
 M. V. Arunachalam - former Vice Chairman and Managing Director Tube Investments, Chennai
 Montek Singh Ahluwalia - Deputy Chairman Union Planning Commission, Government of India, New Delhi
 N. Vaghul - Chairman ICICI Bank, Mumbai
 Raja Jesudoss Chelliah - Founder Chairman Emeritus of Madras School of Economics
 S. Venkitaramanan - former Governor Reserve Bank of India (RBI), Mumbai
 U. Sankar - Honorary Professor Madras School of Economics, Chennai

Areas of Specialization

The School's main areas of specialization are:
Actuarial Economics
Applied Quantitative Finance
Environmental Economics
Financial Economics
General Economics

The School has worked with a broad range of public and private partners to develop research projects on issues such as growth and globalization, environmental sustainability, and investment opportunities.

Centre of Excellence in Environmental Economics

The  Ministry  of  Environment  and  Forest,  Government  of  India  has designated Madras School of Economics as a Centre of Excellence in the area of Environmental Economics.   The Centre carries out research work on: Development of Economic Instruments, Trade and Environment, and Cost-Benefit  Analysis.  The  Centre  is  primarily  engaged  in  research projects,  training  programme  and  providing  policy  assistance  to  the Ministry  on  various  topics.  The  Centre  is  also  responsible  for  the development and maintenance of a website (http://coe.mse.ac.in), and for the dissemination of concept papers on Environmental Economics.

Research

MSE undertakes research on its own as well as carries out research projects sponsored by various agencies such as, government departments, Ministries and International Organizations.  In the past it has undertaken research funded by agencies such as World Resources Institute, Ministry of Environment & Forests, Government of India, the Union Planning Commission, Indian Space Research Organisation, United Nations Development Programme, Royal Netherlands Embassy, International Labour Organisation, The World Bank and Australian Centre for International Agricultural Research.

Student Activities

"Arthiki" is an annual fest of Madras School of Economics, with many events like Quiz, Essay Writing, Crossword, Crisis Management etc. "Alpha" is a club  to create a platform for the students, alumnus and faculty of Madras School of Economics to share their knowledge on topics related to finance and economics. The club conducts workshops, talks by eminent personalities from industry, quizzes and publishes a bi-annual editorial Athena, which is edited by expert student authors from the school and which has contributions from national and international academicians and students. The school also has SPIC MACAY cultural programmes.

Notable alumni
 Vinayak Sasikumar, Lyricist

External links
Official website

References

Universities and colleges in Chennai
Economics schools in India
Research institutes in Chennai
Colleges affiliated to University of Madras
Research institutes established in 1993
1993 establishments in Tamil Nadu